The New Hampshire Central Railroad is a freight railroad in New Hampshire and Vermont, United States. Founded in 1993, the railroad operates several branch lines owned by the state of New Hampshire.

History
The company initially began operations on a  railroad line between North Stratford and Columbia, New Hampshire, previously operated by the North Stratford Railroad. The NHCR also has rights to operate two other lines in New Hampshire: the Groveton Branch between Groveton and Whitefield, and the Berlin branch between Whitefield and Littleton. Interchange is with the St. Lawrence and Atlantic Railroad in North Stratford.

Locomotive fleet

Former units

References 

New Hampshire railroads
Railway companies established in 1993